A life settlement is the legal sale of an existing life insurance policy (typically of seniors) for more than its cash surrender value, but less than its net death benefit, to a third party investor.  The investor assumes the financial responsibility for ongoing premiums and receives the death benefit when the insured dies. The primary reason the policyowner sells is because they can no longer afford the ongoing premiums, they no longer need or want the policy, to fund long-term care, increased medical costs, or they need money for other expenses. On average, the policyowner receives three to five times more than the surrender value for the policy.

In a retained death benefit transaction, policyowners receive cash payments and their beneficiaries also receive a payment after the insured dies. After the transaction has closed, there are no future premium obligations

Term, permanent, or whole life insurance policies qualify for life settlement. Most commonly, universal life insurance policies are sold. Policyowners are generally 65 or older and own a life insurance policy worth $100,000 or more.

Life settlement history

Grigsby v. Russell (1911) 
The U.S. Supreme Court case of Grigsby v. Russell, 222 U.S. 149 (1911) established and legitimized the life insurance industry, ruling that policy as private property, which may be assigned at the will of the owner. The case was argued in November 1911 and decided on December 4, 1911. In Grigsby, John Burchard bought an insurance policy on his life. Unable to afford a premium payment and needing money for an operation, he assigned the policy to a doctor in exchange for 100 dollars. Justice Oliver Wendell Holmes noted in his opinion that life insurance possessed all the ordinary characteristics of property, and therefore represented an asset that a policy owner may transfer without limitation.

1980s - 1999 
Despite the Supreme Court ruling, life settlements remained extremely uncommon due to lack of awareness from policy holders and lack of interest from potential investors. That changed in the 1980s when the U.S. faced an AIDS epidemic.  AIDS victims faced short life expectancies, high unanticipated expenses related to medical care, and selling a life insurance policy that they no longer needed as a way to pay these expenses made sense. However, by the mid-1990s, this investment strategy had faded away because of the rise of antiviral drugs.

In its place arose a new strategy focusing on acquiring policies of the elderly, although a niche business persists to this day acquiring policies on terminally ill of all ages. Policies of terminally ill patients are rare for two key reasons. First, the market size of terminally ill insured interested in selling their policies is small. Second, carriers now offer accelerated death benefit riders, which pay out if the insured is terminally ill, so there is no need for a settlement.

In 1993, the National Association of Insurance Commissioners (NAIC) adopted the first Viatical Settlement Model Act. The term viatical settlement refers to a life settlement where the life expectancy is under two years because the person was terminally ill.

2000 - present 
In 2000, the National Conference of Insurance Legislators (NCOIL) adopted the Life Settlements Model Act. In 2001, "life settlements" became a common term to describe the purchase of life insurance policies from senior citizens.

In 2005, the life settlement industry was regulated in 25 states, providing seniors more value than the cash surrender option.

In 2007, The NAIC and NAIC adopted revisions to the Viatical Settlements Model Act and the Life Settlements Model Act to strengthen consumer protections and address STOLI (stranger-originated life insurance) concerns.

In 2010, NCOIL adopted the Life Insurance Consumers Disclosure Model Act.

Following the Tax Cuts and Jobs Act of 2017, proceeds up to the total amount of premiums paid over time are tax-free, and proceeds more than the tax basis up to the amount of the policy’s surrender value are taxed as ordinary income. Proceeds in excess of the surrender value are taxed as capital gains.

In 2020, the Senior Health Planning Account Act (HR 5958) was introduced in the U.S. House of Representatives. It would allow seniors to pay for health care costs using tax-exempt proceeds from the sale of their life insurance. It was reintroduced in 2021.

Market size 

Life settlements remain a niche asset class. For the year ending 2020, according to the Life Settlement Report by the Deal, there were 3,241 policies purchased with a total face value of $4.6B on the secondary market (from the original policyowner). This was up from 2019 when 2,878 policies for a total face value of $4.4B were purchased on the secondary market. In contrast, as of 2018, there were 267M life insurance policies in force in the United States. Moreover, it is estimated that roughly 10M policies a year lapse. Since the policyowner would always be better off selling rather than lapsing, many believe the life settlement market has tremendous growth potential.

Major trends 

There are three major industry trends. One is the rise in asset capital. More institutional investors are funding life settlements and have invested billions of dollars in assets since the early 2000s. For reference, in the primary market, insurance companies sell life insurance policies to market individuals, who become policyowners. In the secondary market, policyowners' policies are sold to third parties such as life settlement providers, who purchase policies on behalf of third party investors such as institutional investors. In the tertiary market, third party investors trade policies, which are included in the asset class.

Another major trend is direct-to-consumer marketing. Some providers engage in advertising to raise awareness of the life settlement option. This allows policy owners an easy way to engage directly with providers. By working directly with a provider, policy owners are not submitting through a financial advisor or other professional. 
 
The final trend is more efficient medical underwriting. It is the result of new technologies and more reliable data from systems that are utilizing prescription and clinical database searches. While the market for life expectancy companies has grown more competitive, managers have become more adept with analytics and are better able to estimate more accurate life expectancies for life settlement transactions. This mitigates the risk of serious financial losses heightened by prior underwriting methodologies and increases profitability and investor demand for policies.

Transaction parties 

 Policyowner - Party who owns the insurance policy
 Insured - Person(s) whose life is tied to the policy 
 Financial advisor - Advisor to the policyowner
 Life settlement broker - Company that shops policies to life settlement providers
 Life settlement provider - A company that is licensed by state insurance departments to purchase life insurance policies from policyowners
 Investor - Institutions that purchase pools of policies from life settlement providers

A policyowner or the insured may contact a life settlement provider, financial advisor, or life settlement broker regarding the sale of a life insurance policy. Financial advisors may use life settlement brokers to access life settlement providers, or they may go directly to life settlement providers. Financial advisors and life settlement brokers represent the policyowner regarding the sale of a life insurance policy. Life settlement providers purchase policies and either retain ownership of those policies, or they sell pools of policies to institutional investors. Expected returns for the buyer range from 8 to 10 percent after fees.

Transaction process 
In a life settlement transaction, the insured completes an application. Once they receive a formal offer from a life settlement provider, the insured receives a “closing” package containing documents to formalize their acceptance of the life settlement exchange offer. The client signs transfer-of-ownership forms to complete the transaction.

Regulation
Forty three states, approximately 90% of the United States population, is regulated by life settlement laws. However, New Mexico and Michigan only regulate viatical settlements, while Wyoming, South Dakota, Missouri, Alabama, and South Carolina, and Washington, D.C. neither regulate viatical settlements nor life settlements.

However, some states, like Maryland, refer to any life settlement as a viatical settlement.

The Life Insurance Settlement Association (LISA) is a nonprofit created in 1994 to promote legislation and regulation in the industry. Members include brokers, providers, investors, and others. The association annually awards the Alan H. Buerger (AHB) award for Industry Leadership.

The Institutional Longevity Markets Association, Inc. (ILMA) is a trade association formed to regulate the life settlement and longevity marketplace.

The European Life Settlement Association (ELSA) represents European investors, service providers and intermediaries. Founded in 2009, it sets standards for the European life settlement industry.

Valuation techniques 
Life settlements are valued by examining market prices according to the ‘fair value’ approach using closed life settlement transactions. Market data is collected from multiple providers and that information is available to clients as well as third parties. Factors include valuation of the insured’s health, life expectancy, and the face amount of the policy.

Major study findings
An academic study that showed some of the potential of the life settlement market was conducted in 2002 by the University of Pennsylvania business school, the Wharton School. The research papers, credited to Neil Doherty and Hal Singer, were released under the title The Benefits of a Secondary Market For Life Insurance.  This study found, among other things, that life settlement providers paid approximately $340 million to consumers for their under-performing life insurance policies, an opportunity that was not available to them just a few years before.

In 2016, the University of Pennsylvania's Wharton Business School and Washington University’s Olin Business School conducted another academic study. The study found that the majority of life insurance policies do not pay a death benefit, with nearly 85 percent of term policies and 88 percent of universal life policies failing to pay a death claim.

Another study by Conning & Co. Research, Life Settlements: Additional Pressure on Life Profits, found that senior citizens owned approximately $500 billion worth of life insurance in 2003, of which $100 billion was owned by seniors eligible for life settlements.

A life insurance industry sponsored study by Deloitte Consulting and the University of Connecticut came to negative conclusions regarding the life settlement market.

A 2013 study found that a life settlement, on average, delivered four times what policy owners would have received had they surrendered their policies to a life insurance company.

In 2020, the amount paid to sellers increased from $839.6 million to $848.1 million.

References

External links 
 

Investment
Insurance in the United States